Kotlet schabowy is a Polish variety of a breaded cutlet of pork coated with breadcrumbs. It is similar to Viennese schnitzel or Italian cotoletta, and North and South American milanesa.

The history of schabowy dates back to the 19th century. Different recipes for cutlets such as schabowy are featured in an 1860 cookbook by Lucyna Ćwierczakiewiczowa, 365 obiadów za pięć złotych (365 Dinners for Five Złoty), but are missing from the 1786 cookbook by Wojciech Wielądek called Kucharz doskonały (The Perfect Chef),  suggesting that the dish was not known (or at least not popular) before the 19th century. Typical ingredients include eggs, lard or oil, spices, pork loin with or without the bone, breadcrumbs and flour.

Pork tenderloin is cut into one-inch slices and pounded with a mallet until it becomes thinner and soft. It is marinated in milk and onions. The meat is dipped in flour, then in egg, and then covered in breadcrumbs. Oil or lard is heated in a frying pan till it starts to sizzle and the meat is placed onto it, then turned over a couple of times. Kotlet schabowy can be served with cooked potatoes, mashed potatoes, fried mushrooms, cooked vegetables (seared cabbage), salads or coleslaw.

References

 Ewa Czerniakowska, Lucyna Ćwierczakiewiczowa. Przyczynek do historii czasopiśmiennictwa polskiego.  Gdańsk University.  
  "Kotlet schabowy z jedną różnicą." Recipe 1 2  3.

Breaded cutlets
Polish cuisine
Pork dishes
National dishes